is the 49th single by Japanese entertainer Akina Nakamori. Written by Minako Kawae, Nakamori (under the pseudonym "Miran:Miran"), and Daisuke Asakura, the single was released on January 21, 2015, by Utahime Records and Universal Music Japan in two editions: CD single and the limited edition CD + DVD edition. It was also the lead single from her 24th studio album Fixer.

Background 
"Rojo (Tierra)" is Spanish for "Red (Earth)". It was Nakamori's first physical single in over five years, after her 2009 release "Diva Single Version". Due to Nakamori's intention to deliver the new song to fans as soon as possible, the teaser ringtone was distributed on December 24, 2014 as a Christmas present. The full single was first made available online on December 31. Nakamori debuted the song on the 65th Kōhaku Uta Gassen via satellite from a recording studio in Los Angeles.

Chart performance 
"Rojo (Tierra)" peaked at No. 8 on Oricon's weekly singles chart and sold over 25,400 copies, becoming Nakamori's first top-10 since "Gekka" in 1994.

Track listing

Personnel 
"Rojo (Tierra)"
 Daisuke Asakura – digital programming
 Yūji Toriyama – guitar
 Masato Kawase – bass
 Toshiya Matsunaga – percussion
 Tadashi Satō – percussion

"La Vida"
 Jin Oki – flamenco guitar, palmas
 Takamitsu Ishizuka – palmas
 Jose Colón – palmas

Charts

References

External links 
 
 
 

2015 singles
2015 songs
Akina Nakamori songs
Japanese-language songs
Universal Music Japan singles